Vama Buzăului is a commune in Brașov County, Transylvania, Romania. It is composed of four villages: Acriș (Egrestelep), Buzăiel (Kisbodza), Dălghiu (Döblön) and Vama Buzăului.

Vama Buzăului lies on the banks of the Buzău River, close to its source in the Ciucaș Mountains.

Notes

Gallery

External links 

 Vama Buzăului Images
 “Valea Zimbrilor” nature reserve in Vama Buzaului where 23 European bisons live 
 “Valea Zimbrilor” nature reserve at cesavezi.ro 

Communes in Brașov County
Localities in Transylvania
Nature reserves in Romania